Patricio Salvador Moreno Toro (born December 21, 1942) is a Chilean-born American visual artist and painter. His work is associated with abstract expressionism and incorporates Chilean forms and details.

Biography 
Toro was born on December 21, 1942 in Santiago, Chile. He attended the University of Chile.

He immigrated to the United States in 1978, and he moved to Oakland, California in 1981. In 1983, he met Mary Lovelace O'Neal and they married shortly afterward.

Exhibitions
Toro has exhibited his works at Chilean National Museum of Fine Arts in Santiago; Museum of Contemporary Art and Design in San José; Örebro läns Museum in Örebro; University of Oxford in Oxford; Smithsonian Institution Offices in Washington, D.C.; California Science Center in Los Angeles; Kenkeleba Gallery in New York City; the San Francisco Public Library in San Francisco; Berkeley Art Center (1995); Los Angeles County Museum of Art (1981, solo exhibition); University of Hawai'i at Hilo (1990); Casa de las Américas (2017) in Havana; among others.

Toro was part of the exhibition Mano A Mano (1988), which featured 16 Chicano and Latino artists from the San Francisco Bay Area, shown at both the Art Museum of Santa Cruz County and at the Mary Porter Sesnon Gallery at the University of California, Santa Cruz.

Toro was part of the Carlos Villa–curated project, Rehistoricizing The Time Around Abstract Expressionism (2010), which highlighted more artist diversity within abstract expressionist art history. The Rehistoricizing project included a symposium, a website, and related art exhibition at the Luggage Store Gallery in San Francisco.

Collections
de Young Museum, San Francisco
The Paul Robeson Collection, City of Berkeley
Chilean National Museum of Fine Arts

References

1942 births
Living people
People from Santiago
20th-century Chilean painters
Chilean male artists
Chilean male painters
Chilean artists
Male painters
Abstract expressionist artists
20th-century Chilean male artists